The second season of the animated sitcom Home Movies aired in the United States on Cartoon Network’s programming block Adult Swim from January 6 to March 31, 2002.Every Sunday and Thursday night at 9:00 p.m. Central time and 10:00 p.m. Eastern Time. Co-creators Brendon Small and Loren Bouchard, along with Tom Snyder, served as the executive producers for the season. Small and Bill Braudis acted as writers for the season, while Bouchard was director for each episode.

The season follows 8-year-old Brendon Small, who writes, directs, and stars in homemade film productions that he creates with his friends Melissa and Jason, as he gets to know his father, who is remarrying. His mother Paula struggles with finding a new job after being fired from her position as a creative writing teacher at a local college. Meanwhile, Brendon and Melissa's soccer coach, John McGuirk, is a short-tempered, selfish alcoholic who constantly gives the two morally bankrupt advice.

The main cast for the season consisted of Small, Janine Ditullio, H. Jon Benjamin, and Melissa Bardin Galsky. Louis C.K. also served as a recurring guest star throughout the season as Brendon's father. Though the first season of the series utilized producer Snyder's "squigglevision" animation style, season 2 was redesigned to a more "conventional" Flash animation style. Viewers felt that the new look was more attractive and easily accessible in comparison to the previous season.

The complete season DVD was released by Shout! Factory on May 31, 2005, a few months after the release of the first season DVD. It contained all thirteen episodes along with an assortment of bonus features, including optional episode commentary and animatics.

Episodes

Home release 
The DVD boxset for season two was released by Shout! Factory on May 31, 2005. Small originally announced that it would come out on June 10 on his official website, but Shout! Factory later unconfirmed this and released the official date. Other than all thirteen episodes of the season, the DVD included several bonus features, including interviews with the cast and crew, animatics, an animation gallery, commentary tracks selected episodes, and extended musical numbers from the series.

See also 
 Home Movies
 List of Home Movies episodes
 "Get Away From My Mom"
 "The Art of the Sucker Punch"

References

External links 

2002 American television seasons
Home Movies (TV series) seasons